Deira Diaries is a 2021 Indian Malayalam-language drama film written and directed by Mushtaque Rahman kariyaden. The film was directly released on NeeStream, a Malayalam OTT platform on 19 March 2021.

Plot 
Film tells the story of a 60-year-old Malayali who spent four decades as an expatriate in the Gulf and the direct and indirect influence he has had on different individuals. It is said to be distinct from the usual Gulf-based dramas made in Malayalam.

Cast
 Abu Valayamkulam as Yousef
 Shalu Rahim
 Arfaz Iqbal as Shanu
 Roni Abraham
 Sanju Philips
 Naveen Illath
 Roopesh Tellicherry
 Ben Sebastian
 Bindu Sanjeev
 Sangithaa Bijesh
 Reju Antony Gabriel

Music
The film music and score were composed by Sibu Sukumaran.The song "Minnaninja Rave" sung by Najim Arshad and Aavani Malhar, was uploaded on 22 August 2020 on Smart4music YouTube as part of the promotions.

References

External links

}

Films not released in theaters due to the COVID-19 pandemic
2021 films
2020s Malayalam-language films
2021 drama films